Dunja Zdouc (born 3 January 1994) is an Austrian biathlete. She competed in the 2014/15 World Cup season, and represented Austria at the Biathlon World Championships 2015 in Kontiolahti.

Career

Olympic Games
0 medals

World Championships
1 medal (1 silver)

*During Olympic seasons competitions are only held for those events not included in the Olympic program.
**The single mixed relay was added as an event in 2019.

References

External links

1994 births
Living people
Austrian female biathletes
Olympic biathletes of Austria
Sportspeople from Klagenfurt
Biathletes at the 2018 Winter Olympics
Biathletes at the 2022 Winter Olympics
Biathlon World Championships medalists
Austrian people of Slovenian descent